Mesuare Begallo (born 1 March 2000) is an Albanian footballer who plays as a forward for Women's National Championship club FK Partizani Tirana and the Albania women's national team.

Club career
Begallo has played for Partizani in Albania.

International career
Begallo made her senior debut for Albania on 4 April 2019 during a 0–1 friendly away loss to Bosnia and Herzegovina.

See also
List of Albania women's international footballers

References

2000 births
Living people
Sportspeople from Fier
Albanian women's footballers
Women's association football forwards
FK Partizani Tirana players
Albania women's international footballers